Bocianowo  is a village in the administrative district of Gmina Kolno, within Olsztyn County, Warmian-Masurian Voivodeship, in northern Poland. 

The village has a population of 20.

References

Bocianowo